Dance is an art form of coordinated bodily movement, typically to music and musical rhythms (e.g., drum beats).

Dance may also refer to:

Music 
 Dance music, a music genre
 Electronic dance music (sometimes know as dance), a electronic music genre

Albums 
 Dance (Despina Vandi album), 2004
 Dance (Gary Numan album), 1981
 Dance (Keller Williams album), 2003
 Dance (Paul Motian album), 1977
 Dance (Pure Prairie League album), 1976
 Dance (SCH album), 2007
 Dance (Lollipop F album), 2011

Songs 
 "Dance", by Westlife from the album Spectrum
 "Dance", written by Jerry Leiber and Mike Stoller
 "Dance", by Dance Nation
 "Dance", by Rick Astley from the album 50
 "Dance" (Ratt song)
 "Dance" (Nina Girado song)
 "Dance" (Alexandra Stan song)
 "Dance, Dance, Dance (Yowsah, Yowsah, Yowsah)," by Chic
 "Dance (Disco Heat)", by Sylvester
 "Dance (While the Music Still Goes On)", by ABBA
 "Dance!" (Lumidee and Fatman Scoop song), included in the 2006 FIFA World Cup soundtrack
 "Danse" (song), by Grégoire
 "D.A.N.C.E.", by Justice
 "Dance (With U)", by Lemar
 "Dance (A$$)", by Big Sean
 "Dance", by CLMD & Tungevaag (2019)

Places 
 Dancé, Loire, a commune in the Loire department in central France
 Dancé, Orne, a commune in the Orne department in northwestern France
 Dańce, a village in Poland

Television 
 Dance! La Fuerza del Corazón, 2011 Uruguayan telenovela, widely known by the shortened title Dance!
 "Dance", a ChuckleVision episode
 "Dance", a live-action The Super Mario Bros. Super Show! episode
 "Dance", an episode of Off the Air

Other uses 
 Dance (event), a social gathering where people dance
 Dance (surname)
 Dance Magazine
 Dance (Matisse), a 1910 painting by Henri Matisse

See also 
 DNCE, American pop band fronted by Joe Jonas
 Dancer (disambiguation)
 Dancing (disambiguation)
 The Dance (disambiguation)
 La Danse (disambiguation)
 La Dance (disambiguation)
 Dance, Dance (disambiguation)
 Dance, Dance, Dance (disambiguation)